The 1966–67 Challenge Cup was the 66th staging of rugby league's oldest knockout competition, the Challenge Cup.

First round

Second round

Quarter-finals

Semi-finals

Final
In the Challenge Cup final Featherstone Rovers faced Barrow, who were captain-coached by Jim Challinor at Wembley Stadium on Saturday 13 May 1967 in front of a crowd of 76,290.

Featherstone Rovers won 17-12 and it was their first Cup final win in two final appearances.

References

Challenge Cup
Challenge Cup